The following were the scheduled events of sailing for the year 2014 throughout the world.

Events

Olympic classes events

World championships
8–21 September: 2014 ISAF Sailing World Championships in Santander, Spain

Sailing World Cup
12 October 2013 – 30 November 2014: 2013–14 ISAF Sailing World Cup
25 January – 1 February: ISAF Sailing World Cup Miami in Miami, United States
29 March – 5 April: ISAF Sailing World Cup Mallorca in Palma, Spain
19–26 April: ISAF Sailing World Cup Hyeres in Hyères, France
14 October – 30 November: 2014 ISAF Sailing World Cup
14–18 October: ISAF Sailing World Cup Qingdao in Qingdao, China
26–30 November: ISAF Sailing World Cup Final in Abu Dhabi, United Arab Emirates
7 December 2014 – 1 November 2015: 2015 ISAF Sailing World Cup
7–14 December: ISAF Sailing World Cup Melbourne in Melbourne, Australia

African championships
28 December 2014 – 4 January 2015: RS:X African Championships in Bejaia, Algeria

European championships
2–10 May: Finn European Championship in La Rochelle, France
7–14 June: Laser European Championships in, Croatia
28 June – 5 July: RS:X European Championships in Alaçatı, Turkey
4–12 July: Nacra 17 European Championship in La Grande-Motte, France
8–13 July: 49er & 49er FX European Championships in Helsinki, Finland
8–15 July: 470 European Championships in Athens, Greece

North American championships
18–20 January: 470 North American Championships in Miami, United States
18–20 January: 49er & 49er FX North American Championships in Miami, United States
20–22 February: RS:X North American Championships  in Cancun, Mexico
16–18 May: Finn North American Championship in Alamitos Bay, United States
12–15 June: Laser North American Championship in Alamitos Bay, United States

South American championships
30 July – 1 August: 470 South American Championship in Rio de Janeiro, Brazil
5–8 November: 49er & 49er FX South American Championships in Rio de Janeiro, Brazil
3–7 December: RS:X South American Championships  in Buenos Aires, Argentina
8–11 December: Nacra 17 South American Championship in Rio de Janeiro, Brazil

Other major events

Extreme Sailing Series
20 February – 14 December: 2014 Extreme Sailing Series
20–23 February: Act #1 in Singapore, Singapore
19–22 March: Act #2 in Muscat, Oman
1–4 May: Act #3 in Qingdao, China
26–29 June: Act #4 in Saint Petersburg, Russia
22–25 June: Act #5 in Cardiff, United Kingdom
10–14 September: Act #6 in Istanbul, Turkey
2–5 October: Act #7 in Nice, France
11–14 December: Act #8 in Sydney, Australia

PWA World Tour
27 May – 1 June: PWA World Cup - Catalunya Costa Brava in Costa Brava, Spain
20–24 June: PWA World Cup Bonaire - Freestyle in Bonaire, Netherlands Antilles
1–6 July: Awaza PWA World Cup Turkmenistan - Slalom in Turkmenistan
14–20 July: PWA World Cup Gran Canaria - Wave in Gran Canaria, Spain
25 July – 2 August: PWA World Cup Fuerteventura - Freestyle and Slalom in Fuerteventura, Spain
4–10 August: PWA World Cup Tenerife - Wave in Tenerife, Spain
26–31 August: Pegasus Airlines Alaçatı PWA World Cup - Slalom in Alaçatı, Turkey
26 September – 5 October: Davidoff Cool Water Windsurf World Cup Sylt  in Sylt, Germany

Volvo Ocean Race
4 October – 27 June 2015: 2014–15 Volvo Ocean Race
4 October: In-Port Race in Alicante, Spain
11 October: Leg #1 from Alicante, Spain to Cape Town, South Africa
15 November: In-Port Race in Cape Town, South Africa
19 November: Leg #2 from Cape Town, South Africa to Abu Dhabi, United Arab Emirates

World Match Racing Tour
Alpari World Match Racing Tour
5–9 June: Match Race Germany in Langenargen, Germany
30 June – 5 July: Stena Match Cup in Marstrand, Sweden
31 July – 3 August: Sopot Match Race in Sopot, Poland
17–21 September: Chicago Match Cup in Chicago, United States
24–28 September: Lelystad Match Race in Lelystad, Netherlands
21–26 October: Argo Group Gold Cup in Hamilton, Bermuda

Other classes

World championships
8–15 February: Hobie 16 World Championships in New South Wales, Australia
1–8 March: Ice World Championships in Gizycko, Poland
6–11 May: IFCA Funboard Open Slalom World Championships  in Azores, Portugal
16–21 June: IFCA Funboard Slalom Youth & Masters World Championships in Rosas, Spain
27 June – 7 July: Star World Championship in Malcesine, Italy
 : 
 : 
 : 
12–18 July: ISAF Youth Sailing World Championships in Tavira, Portugal
19–26 July: Techno 293 World Under-15 Championships in Brest, France
25 July – 3 August: 420 World Championships in Travemünde, Germany
26 July – 2 August: Laser Radial World Youth Championships in Dziwnów, Poland
8–15 August: Laser 4.7 World Youth Championships in Karatsu, Japan
16–24 August: IFDS Combined World Championships in Halifax, Canada
18–24 August: IKA Formula Kite World Championships in Istanbul, Turkey
19–23 August: RS100 World Championship in Loctudy, France
6–13 September: J/70 World Championship in Newport, United States
 : 
 : 
 : 
18–25 October: RS:X World Youth Championships in Clearwater, United States
22 October – 2 November: Optimist World Championship in Buenos Aires, Argentina

African championships
1–5 May: Laser 4.7 African Championship in Algiers, Algeria
23–28 June: IKA African Championship in Egypt
4–9 September: Open Bic African Championship in Algiers, Algeria
6–14 September: Optimist African Championship in Maputo, Mozambique

Asian championships
28 March – 6 April: Optimist Asian Championship in Al Jazaeer Beach, Bahrain
10–15 November: IKA Asian Championship in Qatar

European championships
21–28 March: Dragon European Championship in Sanremo, Italy
2–9 May: Melges 24 European Championship in Balatonfüred, Hungary
21–27 June: A-Class Catamaran European Championship in Maubuisson, France
26–29 June: Sunfish European Championship in Gargnano, Italy
27–5 July: Hobie Multi European Championships  in Castelldefels, Spain
28 June – 4 July: J/80 European Championship in Barcelona, Spain
9–13 July: European Match Racing Championship in Swinoujscie, Poland
18–20 July: Melges 32 European Championship in Riva del Garda, Italy
18–25 July: 6 Metre European Championship in Falmouth, United Kingdom
21–26 July: OK European Championship in Wunstorf, Germany
22–27 July: Flying Junior European Championship in Arco, Italy
25 July – 1 August: Laser 4.7 European Championship in Norway
8–13 August: Star European Championship in Brunnen, Switzerland
9–15 August: J/24 European Championship in Ängelholm, Sweden
11–18 August: 470 European Junior Championships in Gdynia, Poland
16–24 August: Snipe European Championship & Snipe European Junior Championship in Pomorshi, Poland
2–7 September: IKA European Championship in Poland
17–20 September: European Youth Sailing Championships in Viana do Castello, Portugal
24–27 September: J/70 European Championship in Lake Garda, Italy
27 September – 3 October: One Metre European Championship in Lake Garda, Italy
22–26 October: EUROSAF Disabled Sailing European Championship in Valencia, Spain

North American championships
6–10 August: Sonar North American Championship in Lunenburg, Canada
9–11 August: SKUD18 North American Championship in Halifax, Canada
23–27 September: J/70 North American Championship in Rochester, Canada
6–10 October: IKA North American Championship in United States

South American championships
3–8 February: Formula Kite South American Championships in San Andres Island, Colombia
3–8 February: IKA South American Championship in San Andres Island, Colombia
10–20 April: Optimist South American Championship in Colombia
29 December 2014 – 4 January 2015: 29er South American Championship in Mar del Plata, Argentina

Other events
20–24 May: Delta Lloyd Regatta in Medemblik, Netherlands
2–6 June: Sail for Gold in Weymouth & Portland, United Kingdom
21–29 June: Kiel Week in Kiel, Germany
26 December 2014 – 1 January 2015: Sydney to Hobart Yacht Race from Sydney, Australia to Hobart, Australia

References

 
Sailing by year